Diego Mario Buonanotte Rende (born 19 April 1988) is an Argentine naturalized Chilean footballer who plays for Peruvian club Sporting Cristal as an attacking midfielder and winger.

He began his career with River Plate, where he won the Apertura in 2008, and later played in Spain with Málaga and Granada.

Buonanotte was part of the Argentine squad that won the gold medal at the 2008 Olympics.

Club career

River Plate
Born in Teodelina, Santa Fe, Buonanotte made his professional debut as a 17-year-old on 9 April 2006, in the 3–1 win against Instituto. On 7 October 2007, only one week after his first game, he scored his first goal at senior level. Buonanotte was picked by coach Daniel Passarella to start in the derby against Boca Juniors. River Plate won 2–0, with Buonanotte playing a key role in the victory. He was named by World Soccer magazine as one of the '50 most exciting teenagers in the world game'. Buonanotte was part of the 2008 Apertura winning team.

Málaga
On 21 January 2011 Buonanotte signed a five-year contract with Málaga CF, but he was loaned to River Plate until July 2011. The reason he left Malaga was not about his appearances with his team but the 1.6 million dollars that River Plate gave for a loan for him. He scored his first goal for Málaga on 21 December 2011 in a 2–2 home draw against Getafe CF in the Copa del Rey (winning 3–2 on aggregate.) On 21 November 2012, he scored his careers first Champions League goal, in a 2−2 away draw against Zenit. Also he scored goals against Barcelona and Real Madrid.

Granada
On 31 January 2013, Buonanotte signed a -year contract with Granada. After moving to Granada, Buonanotte told Goal.com, he left Malaga in order to get playing time. He was previously linked with a move to Italian side Palermo but opted for Granada.

On 28 August 2014, after being left out of the first-team during the pre-season, Buonanotte was loaned to C.F. Pachuca in a one-year deal.

After playing in their pre-season in Mexico, Buonanotte signed on a six-month loan for Quilmes AC on 30 January 2015.

AEK Athens
In August 2015, Buonanotte signed a two-year contract with AEK Athens.

On the third matchday of the 2015–16 season he scored twice in a 3–1 home win against PAS Giannina. On 22 November 2015, he scored his fifth league goal helping AEK Athens win against Panthrakikos. On 2 December 2015, he scored two goals in his first appearance in the Greek Cup in a 6–0 home win against Panelefsiniakos. On 17 December, he again scored a brace in a 5–0 away win against AEL in the cup. He finished the year with 11 goals in 35 appearances in all competitions.

Universidad Católica
On 19 July 2016, Buonanotte signed for Universidad Católica. There, he won the 2016 Apertura, scoring 8 goals in 13 matches. Also winning the 2016 Clausura, and most recently 2018-2019 Chilean Primera Division.

Sporting Cristal
In 5 July 2022, Buonanotte joined Peruvian side Sporting Cristal until December 2023.

International career
Buonanotte was selected by Sergio Batista to be one of the 18 players to represent Argentina in the 2008 Olympics. He only played in the third group-stage game against Serbia, scoring from a long-range free-kick. He won the gold medal with his national team at that tournament.

Personal life

Car crash
In December 2009, Buonanotte survived a fatal car crash as the sole survivor after he lost control of his car on an Argentine freeway. He was taken to the hospital with multiple injuries while three friends who were travelling with him in the car died at the scene of the crash. The footballer was driving his father's Peugeot 307 back from a night out when he veered off the 65th highway and collided with a tree. The accident occurred about 15 km outside Clementina, Santa Fe. Another car carrying more friends of Buonanotte also arrived on the scene of the accident afterwards eager to find out what had happened. The footballer is said to have been conscious when he was pulled from the wreckage but had sustained serious injuries.

Eduardo Allegrini, director of the hospital, where Buonanotte was taken after the crash, said "(Buonanotte) has fractured his right humerus, right clavicle and has bruised his right lung". Allegrini clarified that the River player's condition was stable but he remained in intensive care under observation. Guillermo Fernández, a firefighter who helped pull Buonanotte from the crash site said: "Diego told us he lost control of the car".

Back to the pitch
It was initially thought that Buonanotte's convalescence would require up to seven months for complete recovery, but he was able to return to the pitch on 17 April 2010, when he replaced Diego Barrado in the second half of a match against Godoy Cruz. River won 2–1 at home. On 30 April, he scored for the first time since his accident, clinching a 2–1 victory against Vélez Sársfield at the Monumental. Later that year, A local prosecutor Carlos Colimedaglia, believes that Buonanotte should be charged with three counts of manslaughter. Buonanotte, himself, says he managed to cope with the accident but revealed the opposition fans shout slurs directed at him, like "murderer".

Chilean naturalization
In December 2021, he acquired the Chilean nationality by residence along with his colleague Matías Zaldivia, keeping the Argentine nationality.

Career statistics

Club

Honours

Club
River Plate
 Primera División de Argentina: 2008-C

AEK
 Greek Cup: 2015–16

Universidad Católica
 Chilean Primera División: 2016 Apertura, 2018, 2019, 2020, 2021
 Supercopa de Chile: 2016, 2019, 2020, 2021

International
 Summer Olympics Gold medal: 2008

Individual
Toulon Tournament Golden Ball: 2009
Toulon Tournament Golden Boot: 2009
Chilean Primera División Team of the Year: 2018

References

External links
 
 
 
 

1988 births
Living people
People from General López Department
Argentine footballers
Naturalized citizens of Chile
Chilean footballers
Association football midfielders
Club Atlético River Plate footballers
Málaga CF players
Granada CF footballers
C.F. Pachuca players
Quilmes Atlético Club footballers
AEK Athens F.C. players
Club Deportivo Universidad Católica footballers
Sporting Cristal footballers
Argentine Primera División players
La Liga players
Liga MX players
Super League Greece players
Chilean Primera División players
Peruvian Primera División players
Footballers at the 2008 Summer Olympics
Olympic footballers of Argentina
Olympic gold medalists for Argentina
Olympic medalists in football
Medalists at the 2008 Summer Olympics
Argentine expatriate footballers
Argentine expatriate sportspeople in Spain
Expatriate footballers in Spain
Argentine expatriate sportspeople in Mexico
Expatriate footballers in Mexico
Argentine expatriate sportspeople in Greece
Expatriate footballers in Greece
Argentine expatriate sportspeople in Chile
Expatriate footballers in Chile
Argentine emigrants to Chile
Chilean expatriate footballers
Argentine expatriate sportspeople in Peru
Chilean expatriate sportspeople in Peru
Expatriate footballers in Peru
Argentine people of Italian descent
Sportspeople from Santa Fe Province